The Salmon River is a tributary of the Queets River in U.S. state of Washington.

The river flows roughly from east to south, with the North Fork Salmon River, Middle Fork Salmon River, South Fork Salmon River, combining to form the Salmon River, which empties into the Queets River.

Geology
The North, Middle, and South Fork watersheds are composed of shale, and sandstone, both sedimentary rocks, while the watershed of the lower Salmon River is composed of "coastal piedmont consisting of porous, unconsolidated deposits of Olympic alpine glaciers, including gravels, sands, silts and clays."

Ecology

More than 80% of the watershed is covered by coniferous forests (including Sitka spruce, western hemlock, and Douglas-fir), with the remainder being hardwood stands and unforested wetlands.

There is a hatchery on the river that breeds Coho salmon and Chinook salmon. Some number of hatchery Winter steelhead smolts are planted in the river every year. Sea-run cutthroat trout and Chinook salmon also inhabit the river.

See also
List of rivers of Washington

References

External links
 

Rivers of Washington (state)
Rivers of Jefferson County, Washington